The W. R. Grace Building is a skyscraper in Manhattan, New York City. The building was designed principally by Gordon Bunshaft, and completed in 1972. The building was commissioned by the W.R. Grace Company, and was also used by the Deloitte & Touche, LLP.

The building is located at 1114 Sixth Avenue, but the main entrance is on 42nd Street, between Fifth and Sixth Avenues. It overlooks Bryant Park and the New York Public Library's main branch.

The Grace Building is located on the former site of Stern's flagship department store and headquarters. Tenants include Bain & Company. The Michelin-starred restaurant Gabriel Kreuther is located in its lobby as well as a sister chocolate store.

Architecture

One of the aesthetic attributes of the building is the concave vertical slope of its north and south facades, on 42nd and 43rd Street. The Grace Building uses the original, rejected design for the facade of the Solow Building, another Bunshaft creation.  The sloping facade is also similar to the Chase Tower in Chicago. The exterior of the building is covered in white travertine, which forms a contrast against the black windows and makes the building appear brighter than those surrounding it.

See also
List of tallest buildings in New York City

References

External links

 
 in-Arch.net: building information

Bryant Park buildings
Office buildings completed in 1974
Skidmore, Owings & Merrill buildings
Skyscraper office buildings in Manhattan
1974 establishments in New York City
Building